The Dibang River Bridge is a beam bridge across Dibang River which connects Bomjir and Malek villages and provides all-weather connectivity between Dambuk and Roing in eastern part of Arunachal Pradesh, India. At 6.2 km long, it is the second-longest bridge above water in India and was completed in 2018 as part of NH13 Trans-Arunachal Highway. This strategically important bridge helps Indian military combat anti-national activities and Chinese military threat in the easter sector of Line of Actual Control border areas. It is  known as "Sikang" in Adi Language  and "Talon" in Idu Mishmi language.

History 
In 2010, the Union Cabinet Committee on Infrastructure approved the project for construction of bridges across Sikang river system and connecting road between Bomjir-Meka on NH-52, covering a length of 18.950 km. NH-52 has been renumbered as National Highway 13 which is also known as Trans-Arunachal Highway. Expenditure on the project was incurred out of Ministry of Development of North Eastern Region's the budget allocations for Special Accelerated Road Development Programme for North Eastern Region. The 750 crore rupees project has seen disruptions due to resistance from locals. In 2018, it became operational after construction completion and testing.

Location 

This bridge spans across Sikang river system in Arunachal Pradesh. It is located in lower dibang valley district of Arunachal Pradesh.

See also 
 Bhupen Hazarika Setu
 List of longest bridges above water in India
 Trans-Arunachal Highway

References

External links 
 Longest Bridge of Arunachal Pradesh Dibang Bridge is the second longest in India
 Navayuga Engineering Company Limited, current major projects

Bridges in Arunachal Pradesh
Road bridges in India